"Bela Lugosi's Dead" is a song by the English post-punk band Bauhaus. It was the band's first single, released on 6 August 1979 by record label Small Wonder. It is often considered the first gothic rock record.

History 
"Bela Lugosi's Dead" was recorded "live in the studio" in a single take during a six-hour session at Beck Studios in Wellingborough on 26 January 1979. It was the first thing they recorded together, six weeks after the band had formed. All four band members are credited as writers of the song: vocalist Peter Murphy, guitarist Daniel Ash, drummer Kevin Haskins and bassist David J . David J has claimed that he wrote the lyrics. Alternate versions of "Bela Lugosi's Dead" also included a portion of the early demo recording of their next single, "Dark Entries".

Four additional songs were also recorded during the same session: "Boys"; "Bite My Hip"; "Some Faces" and the ska-reggae tune "Harry", which was about Deborah Harry, the lead singer of Blondie. Regarding this session, Kevin Haskins said, "There’s power pop in there, and ska too. We were trying to find our voice."

Of the songs recorded during that session (aside from "Bela Lugosi's Dead") only "Harry" found an official release; in 1982 as a B-side to the single "Kick in the Eye." A version of "Boys" recorded at Beck Studios later in 1979 was used as a B-side to the original release of the "Bela Lugosi's Dead" single. The remaining tracks, including the original recording of "Boys," remained unreleased until 2018 when "The Bela Session" was released on vinyl and CD, and made available for digital download by the band. Of the additional tracks, Classic Rock magazine wrote that, "The rest of the material finds a band fumbling for direction, even touching on ska."

Content 

The song is over nine minutes long; the vocals start (in the studio version) almost three minutes into the track. The dub-influenced guitar sound was achieved by using partial barre chords and leaving the  open.

The song takes its name from the horror film star Bela Lugosi, who is known for his role as the title character in the 1931 film Dracula.

The sleeve cover art was taken from the 1926 film The Sorrows of Satan, directed by D. W. Griffith.

Releases 
"Bela Lugosi's Dead" was released in August 1979, but did not enter the UK charts. The original 12" release was on white vinyl and limited to 5,000 copies. Various other releases are included in the following:

 Black vinyl with black-on-white sleeve (up to five versions exist, based on comparisons of runout matrices on each of the releases and sleeve format)
 Blue vinyl with blue-on-white sleeve
 Clear vinyl with brown-on-white sleeve
 Green transparent vinyl with green-on-white sleeve
 Pink vinyl with pink-on-white sleeve
 Purple transparent vinyl with purple-on-white sleeve
 Glow-in-the-dark vinyl picture disc with clear plastic sleeve

It had a few releases on CD single:
 Small Wonder, 1988 (black-on-white cover in J-case; without "Dark Entries (Demo)")
 Bauhausmusik, 1998 (cover image with black border and red band logo and title on cardboard sleeve)
 Self-released, 2005 (cover image imposed on moon photo with black background and white band logo on cardboard sleeve; without "Dark Entries (Demo)", but adding "The Dog's a Vapour")

The song was included on the 1998 Bauhaus compilation album Crackle.  In 2018, the track was released again on vinyl, CD and digital download as part of The Bela Session, along with four other recordings made during the same session in early 1979, three of which were unreleased up to that point.

Other releases 
In the 1983 erotic horror film The Hunger, Bauhaus performed the song during the opening credits and introduction. A 7″ promotional record featuring an edited version of the song was released to theaters playing the film. A live version of the track, released in 1982 and recorded on 24 February 1982 at The Old Vic, London, is found on Press the Eject and Give Me the Tape, and the same version is also found on the band's compilation album Bauhaus 1979–1983. For the 1998 greatest-hits collection Crackle, Beggars Banquet stitched together the “Tomb Raider Version” from outtakes and live recordings. The band never approved it and refers to it instead as the “Frankenstein version.”

Legacy 

"Bela Lugosi's Dead" is considered the harbinger of gothic rock music and has been immensely influential on contemporary goth culture. In an article by The Guardian titled "Bauhaus invent goth", the newspaper ranked the song number 19 on their list of the 50 key events in indie music history, stating:

The song was ranked #60 in Rolling Stones "The 100 Greatest Debut Singles of All Time".
 Other versions 
 "Bela Lugosi's Dead (Undead Is Forever)" 
 Bauhaus bassist David J, in collaboration with Jill Tracy, released "Bela Lugosi's Dead (Undead Is Forever)" on 31 October 2013.

 Cover versions 
 Until December covered it as a b-side for their single "Heaven" (1986).
 The Electric Hellfire Club covered it for the Bauhaus tribute album The Passion of Covers (1996).
 Opera IX covered it for their album The Black Opera: Symphoniæ Mysteriorum in Laudem Tenebrarum (2000).
 Sepultura covered it for their album Nation (2001).
 Nouvelle Vague covered it for their album Bande à part (2006).
 Chris Cornell covered it during a live performance in 2007. 
 Nine Inch Nails covered it with Peter Murphy during a live performance in 2009. 
 Trent Reznor covered it with Peter Murphy and TV on the Radio during a live performance in 2013.
 Massive Attack covered it during a live performance in 2013 and 2019.
 Chvrches covered it for the soundtrack to the film Vampire Academy (2014); the track was also played during the ending credits of the film.
 Dead Cross covered it for their album Dead Cross (2017).
 The Damned covered it during a live performance in 2019.

 Track listing 12" singleThe Hunger MixThe Bela Session EP'

Personnel 
 Bauhaus
 Peter Murphy: vocals
 Daniel Ash: guitars
 David J: bass
 Kevin Haskins: drums

References 

Bauhaus (band) songs
1979 debut singles
Songs about actors
Cultural depictions of Bela Lugosi
Songs about death
1979 songs
Songs written by Daniel Ash
Songs about vampires
Halloween songs